The 2001 Star World Championships were held in Medemblik, Netherlands between August 2 and 12, 2001.

Results

References

External links
 

Star World Championships
2001 in sailing
Sailing competitions in the Netherlands